Monghpyak Township is a township of Tachileik District (formerly part of Mong Hpayak District) in the Eastern Shan State of Myanmar. The principal town is Monghpyak. Its part under Shan State Special region 4 administration is known as Nanban District.

References

Townships of Shan State